Argyrodendron is a genus of mainly trees in the family Malvaceae. They occur in Malesia, New Guinea and Australia. In Australia, they are a well-known rainforest species known by their Indigenous Australian name, booyong or the tulip oak.

Argyrodendron has often been treated as a synonym of Heritiera, but a recent molecular study shows it to be distinct therefrom.

In their native habitat, they can grow tall, 40–60 metres, but rarely reach this in cultivation. The bases of large trees are usually prominently buttressed. Leaves with white or silver on underside. Argyrodendron actinophyllum and Argyrodendron trifoliolatum occur in scrubs and rainforests along the east coast of Australia, but Argyrodendron peralatum has a restricted distribution in north Queensland between Tully and Cooktown. The grain is usually straight and open, sometimes interlocked or wavy and irregular producing some beautifully figured wood. Attractive figure on tangential face and large ray fleck on radial face are prominent features of Argyrodendron wood.

References

Sterculioideae
Malvaceae genera